Barilius barila is a tropical fish in genus Barilius of the family Cyprinidae. It is commercially very important due to its superior taste. It is found in the Asian countries of India, Nepal, Bangladesh and Myanmar. Normally found in clear streams in the foothills. Its maximum length is 10 cm.

References 

Barilius
Fish of Bangladesh
Fish of India
Fish described in 1822